The University of Djibouti is a public university in Djibouti City, the capital of Djibouti.

History
The University of Djibouti was established on 7 January 2006 by Decree. It grew out of the University Centre of Djibouti.

In 2008, the university had 2,500 students. The student body reaches more than 7000 in 2015.

Components
The University of Djibouti has five faculties and two institutes.

Faculties
 Faculty of Law, Economics and Management (FDEG)
 Faculty of Science (FS)
 Faculty of Humanities, Languages and Social Sciences (FLLSH)
 Faculty of Medicine
 Faculty of Engineering

Institutes
 Technical Institute of Industry (IUT-I)
 Technical Institute of Tertiary Services

References
Université de Djibouti

External links
 Official website

Education in Djibouti
Universities in Djibouti
Educational institutions established in 2006